Grevillea newbeyi is a species of flowering plant in the family Proteaceae and is endemic to the south west region of Western Australia. It is a dome-shaped, prickly shrub with divided leaves, the end lobes linear, rigid and sharply-pointed, and clusters of smoky pink and creamy-white flowers with a pink style.

Description

It is similar in appearance to G. patentiloba and G. tripartita.

Taxonomy
Grevillea newbeyi was first formally described in 1986 by Donald McGillivray in his book New Names in Grevillea (Proteaceae). The specific epithet (newbeyi) honours Kenneth Newbey.

Distribution and habitat
This grevillea grows in shrubland and heath between Kukerin, Ongerup and Newdegate in the Avon Wheatbelt and Mallee bioregions of south-western Western Australia.

Conservation status
Grevillea newbeyi is listed as "Priority Three" by the Government of Western Australia Department of Biodiversity, Conservation and Attractions, meaning that it is poorly known and known from only a few locations but is not under imminent threat.

References

newbeyi
Eudicots of Western Australia
Proteales of Australia
Taxa named by Donald McGillivray
Plants described in 1986